Joshua Robert Colley is an American actor.

Personal life
Joshua Colley and his twin brother Cameron were born on January 20, 2002, to Brad and Robbie Lynn Colley. Colley was raised in Trinity, Florida.

Career
Colley played the role of Les in the musical Newsies between March 11, 2013 and February 2, 2014. In January 2014, it was announced that Colley would play the role of Gavroche in the Broadway revival of Les Misérables, alternating in that role with Gaten Matarazzo.  Colley started with the show when it began previews on March 1, 2014 and performed until March 1, 2015. The Huffington Post called Colley's performance "'grounded and believable and anything but an outtake from Oliver!"

In 2014, Colley was cast as the voice of Pig Robinson in the Nick Jr. animated television show Peter Rabbit.  He voiced the role from 2014 to 2015.

Colley played the lead role in You're a Good Man, Charlie Brown at the York Theater Company from May 24, 2016 to June 26, 2016.  The cast album was released on November 18, 2016 by Broadway Records.

He took one week off of the run to perform in The Little Mermaid at the Hollywood Bowl.  Colley played the role of Flounder, alongside Sara Bareilles, Tituss Burgess, John Stamos, and Rebel Wilson in the first week of June 2016.

In 2021, he joined the cast of Hulu's Sex Appeal as well as American comedy film Senior Year.

In the third and final season of the coming-of-age series Love, Victor Colley portrayed Liam, Victor's sharp-tongued classmate.

On October 12, 2022, he was cast to play Monty in the upcoming HBO Max series titled Dead Boy Detectives.

Filmography

Theatre credits

References

American male musical theatre actors
American male child actors
Living people
2002 births